Asparagus horridus is a species of shrub in the family Asparagaceae. They are climbing plants. They have simple, broad leaves and fleshy fruit.

The species is native to Algeria, Balearic Islands, Canary Islands, Cyprus, East Aegean Islands, Egypt, Greece, Gulf States, Italy, Crete, Lebanon, Syria, Libya, Morocco, Palestine, Sardegna, Saudi Arabia, Sicilia, Sinai, Spain and Tunisia.

References

Sources

horridus